The Camden Professorship of Ancient History at the University of Oxford was established in 1622 by English antiquary and historian William Camden, Clarenceux King of Arms, and endowed with the income of the manor of Bexley, becoming the first and oldest chair of history in England.  Since 1877 it has been attached to Brasenose College, and since 1910 it has been limited to Roman history.

List of Camden Professors of Ancient History
List of holders of the chair since its foundation:
 Degory Wheare 1622–1647
 Robert Waryng 1647–1648
 Lewis du Moulin 1648–1660
 John Lamphire 1660–1688
 Henry Dodwell 1688–1691
 Charles Aldworth 1691–1720
 Sedgwick Harrison 1720–1727
 Richard Frewin 1727–1761
 John Warneford 1761–1773
 William Scott (later Lord Stowell) 1773–1785
 Thomas Warton 1785–1790
 Thomas Winstanley 1790–1823
 Peter Elmsley 1823–1825
 Edward Cardwell 1825–1861
 George Rawlinson 1861–1889
 Henry Francis Pelham 1889–1907
 Francis John Haverfield 1907–1919
 Henry Stuart Jones 1920–1927
 John Anderson 1927–1936
 Hugh Last 1936–1949
 Ronald Syme 1949–1970
 Peter Brunt 1970–1982
 Fergus Millar 1984–2002
 Alan Bowman 2002–2010
 Nicholas Purcell 2011–

References

Sources
 The Historical Register of the University of Oxford, 1220–1900. OUP
 The Foundation and History of the Camden Chair: lecture by Prof H Stuart Jones, 1922

Ancient History, Camden
Ancient History, Camden, Oxford
Ancient History, Camden, Oxford
1622 establishments in England
Brasenose College, Oxford
Lists of people associated with the University of Oxford